Đorđe Drenovac (born 9 August 1992) is a Serbian professional basketball player for DEAC of the Hungarian First League.

He played for Mega Vizura, Traiskirchen Lions, Fortitudo Bologna, Valladolid, Igokea, MZT Skopje, Mitteldeutscher BC.

References

External links 
 Profile at aba-liga.com
 Profile at eurobasket.com
 Profile at fiba.com

1992 births
Living people
ABA League players
Basketball players from Belgrade
CB Valladolid players
Competitors at the 2013 Mediterranean Games
Fortitudo Pallacanestro Bologna players
KK Igokea players
KK Mega Basket players
KK MZT Skopje players
KK Mornar Bar players
Liga ACB players
Medalists at the 2013 Summer Universiade
Mediterranean Games medalists in basketball
Mediterranean Games silver medalists for Serbia
Mitteldeutscher BC players
Serbian expatriate basketball people in Austria
Serbian expatriate basketball people in Bosnia and Herzegovina
Serbian expatriate basketball people in Germany
Serbian expatriate basketball people in Italy
Serbian expatriate basketball people in Montenegro
Serbian expatriate basketball people in North Macedonia
Serbian expatriate basketball people in Spain
Serbian men's basketball players
Small forwards
Traiskirchen Lions players
Universiade bronze medalists for Serbia
Universiade medalists in basketball
Serbian expatriate basketball people in Hungary
Debreceni EAC (basketball) players